Kathleen Dillingham is an American politician from Maine. A Republican, Dillingham has been a member of the Maine House of Representatives since her election in 2014. While she was re-elected in November 2018, the Maine Republicans drastically reduced their numbers in the state legislature. She was subsequently chosen as Minority Leader by her colleagues. She represents the towns of Mechanic Falls, Otisfield, and Oxford. She previously served on the MSAD 17 School Board.

Her father is Euro-American and her mother is Puerto Rican, making her "the first Hispanic Republican Legislative Leader in Maine."

References

External links
Kathleen Dillingham at Ballotpedia
Project Vote Smart – Representative Kathleen Dillingham (ME) profile
Our Campaigns – Representative Kathleen Dillingham (ME) profile
Office website

1970 births
21st-century American politicians
21st-century American women politicians
American politicians of Puerto Rican descent
Living people
Maine Republicans
Minority leaders of the Maine House of Representatives
Puerto Rican women in politics
School board members in Maine
Women state legislators in Maine